Derlis González (born 25 May 1978) is a Paraguayan footballer. He played in four matches for the Paraguay national football team in 2004. He was also part of Paraguay's squad for the 2004 Copa América tournament.

References

External links
 

1978 births
Living people
Paraguayan footballers
Paraguay international footballers
Place of birth missing (living people)
Association football defenders